Alvin Moore (born May 3, 1959) is a former American football running back who played five seasons in the National Football League (NFL) with the Baltimore/Indianapolis Colts, Detroit Lions and Seattle Seahawks. He was drafted by the Baltimore Colts in the seventh round of the 1983 NFL Draft. He played college football at Arizona State University and attended Coolidge High School in Coolidge, Arizona.

References

External links
 Just Sports Stats
 College stats

1959 births
Living people
People from Pinal County, Arizona
Sportspeople from the Phoenix metropolitan area
Players of American football from Arizona
African-American players of American football
American football running backs
Arizona State Sun Devils football players
Baltimore Colts players
Indianapolis Colts players
Detroit Lions players
Seattle Seahawks players
National Football League replacement players
21st-century African-American people
20th-century African-American sportspeople